The 2011 Minnesota Golden Gophers football team represented the University of Minnesota for the 2011 college football season. The Golden Gophers are members of the Big Ten Conference and played their home games at TCF Bank Stadium. They were led by head coach Jerry Kill for his first season as head coach at Minnesota. They finished with 3–9 overall record, 2–6 in Big Ten Legends play.

Roster

|}

Schedule

Game summaries

@ USC

Matt Barkley threw three touchdowns to Robert Woods as the Trojans won their 14th straight season opener. Barkley went 34-of-45 with 304 yards while Woods caught 17 passes, a USC single-game record, for 177 yards in the win. D.J. Morgan added 18 carries for 70 yards in the win for USC.

Duane Bennett ran for a touchdown while Max Shortell threw for a touchdown but was intercepted on the final drive for the Golden Gophers, who failed to win in the debut of new head coach Jerry Kill.

Bennett finished with 53 yards on 15 carries while MarQueis Gray went 7-of-12 with 94 yards and added 48 yards on 16 carries for Minnesota, which went just 3–9 last season.

The Gophers never led in the game, but made it a one-score possession with 8:03 to play when Shortell hit Brandon Green on a short pass to the left and the receiver curled around his defender and into the end zone from 12 yards out to make it 19–17.

Minnesota got the ball back at its own nine-yard line with just over two minutes to play. However, the drive only made it to the Minnesota 28 and on 3rd-and-1 Shortell was picked off by Torin Harris and the Trojans killed off the rest of the clock.

vs. New Mexico State

Aside from losing the game 28–21, this game represented a scare for Minnesota outside of the game itself as head coach Jerry Kill had a seizure with 20 seconds left in the game and was taken away by ambulance.

Kill was stabilized, and Minnesota's team physician said the coach's condition was not life-threatening. Kill has had similar episodes three times before in his career, but never missed a game, and his assistants said they weren't worried.

Regarding the game, the Aggies set the tone from the start with a six-play, 60-yard drive. Manley hit Rogers for a 26-yard score, with cornerback Brock Vereen and safety Shady Salamon failing to reach Rogers in time. Manley had help from Robert Clay, who rushed 20 times for 97 yards and a touchdown. Taveon Rogers had 88 yards receiving and two scores.

MarQueis Gray had another uneven performance at quarterback for the Gophers, who hadn't lost their first two games to start a season since 1992. Da'Jon McKnight made a handful of acrobatic catches, finishing with 146 yards and one touchdown, and tight end Colin McGarry dived to haul in a 10-yard score in the corner of the end zone and pull the Gophers within 21–14 right before the half.

Gray, who was relieved in the third quarter by freshman Max Shortell because he had cramps on a hot day, finished with 110 yards rushing on 17 attempts. He went 16 for 32 through the air for 211 yards, two touchdowns and two interceptions. Gray threaded a perfect pass to McKnight on a quick post route for a 4-yard touchdown with 11:47 left, pulling the Gophers within 28–21.

He nearly tied the game later on a rollout with a head-first dive at the pylon with 7:51 left, and the initial ruling on the field was a touchdown. But a replay review determined his foot was out of bounds.

On fourth and 1, Edwards was stopped and NMSU took over.

Clay and Victor Johnson ground down the clock for the Aggies, and the Gophers didn't get the ball back until 2:09 remained, starting at their own 11-yard line with no timeouts. This proved to be too much for the Gophers to overcome.

Iowa

References

External links

Minnesota
Minnesota Golden Gophers football seasons
Minnesota Golden Gophers football